An officer is a person who has a position of authority in a hierarchical organization. The term derives from Old French oficier "officer, official" (early 14c., Modern French officier), from Medieval Latin officiarius "an officer," from Latin officium "a service, a duty" the late Latin from officiarius, meaning "official."

Examples

Ceremonial and other contexts
Officer, and/or Grand Officer, are both a grade, class, or rank of within certain chivalric orders and orders of merit, e.g. Legion of Honour (France), Order of the Holy Sepulchre (Holy See), Order of the British Empire (UK), Order of Leopold (Belgium)
Great Officer of State
Merchant marine officer or licensed mariner
Officer of arms
Officer in The Salvation Army, and other state decorations

Corporations
Bank officer
Corporate officer, a corporate title
Chief executive officer (CEO)
Chief financial officer (CFO)
Chief operating officer (COO)
Executive officer

Education
Chief academic officer, a provost
Sabbatical officer

Law enforcement
Bylaw enforcement officer
Corrections officer
Customs officer
Environmental Health Officer
Officer of the court
Parking enforcement officer
Police officer
Security officer

Military
Officer (armed forces)
 Commanding officer
 Petty officer

Politics and government
Chief Medical Officer
Foreign Service Officer, a diplomatic officer
Internal Service Officer, a diplomatic officer
Presiding Officer (disambiguation)
Returning officer

Shipping industry
Captain (nautical), the person in charge of a merchant ship
Chief Engineering Officer, the person in charge of the technical department on a merchant ship
Chief officer or chief mate, typically the person in charge of the deck department of a merchant ship
Coastguard Rescue Officer, a rescue officer employed by HM Coastguard
Second officer or second mate, typically the navigator and medical officer on a merchant ship
Third officer or third mate, typically the safety officer on a merchant ship
Second Engineering Officer, the person in charge of the engine room on a merchant ship
Third Engineering Officer, an Engineering Officer of the Watch

See also
First Officer (disambiguation)

References

Management occupations
Positions of authority